Margie V. "The Marvelous One" Martin (née Smith) (born February 7, 1979) is an American professional female bodybuilder. She is the first Ms Rising Phoenix of the 2015 and the 2016 IFBB Wings of Strength Rising Phoenix World Championships.

U.S. Marine Corps career

At the age of 17, Martin entered the Marine Corps, like her father before her. During her time in the Marines, she reached the rank of sergeant. She remained in the Marines until 2007.

U.S. Department of Defense career

From November 2007 to April 2009, Martin worked in Urasoe-shi, Okinawa, Japan, as a Human Resource Specialist for the U.S. Department of Defense.

Bodybuilding career

Amateur career

Martin as a little girl wanted to be a bodybuilder. Her first introduction to bodybuilding came early on when she met Lee Haney at her local church. She asked him what she needed to do to become a bodybuilder. Her mother and father loved to work out. She use to watch the women of GLOW and American Gladiators wishing she could become like them. What inspired her growing up was She-Ra from She-Ra: Princess of Power or Tigress from ThunderCats.

At the age of 13, Martin started weight training for the first time during the summer. In high school the school had a bodybuilding class where she was the only female in the class. In 2007, she started thinking about competing in bodybuilding for the first time after losing weight after trying to work out so hard after several years after having her son as an unwed mother. People started telling her to do a local bodybuilding show. She didn't know how to diet, so she only ate canned tuna and string beans for almost six weeks. She placed 5th in her first competition, the Far East Armed Forces Bodybuilding Competition in Okinawa, Japan.

In August 2012, Martin was named NPC's August 2012 Athlete of the Month. was At the 2013 NPC USA Championships, she placed 1st in heavyweight category and overall, thus winning her IFBB pro card.

Professional career

In 2014, Martin made her IFBB pro debut at the 2014 IFBB Toronto Pro Supershow, where she placed 4th. At the 2014 IFBB Omaha Pro, she placed 2nd. She qualified for her first IFBB Ms. Olympia, the 2014 IFBB Ms. Olympia, where she placed 10th. In 2015, she competed at five IFBB competitions. At the 2015 IFBB Omaha Pro, she won 7th place and won the best poser award. At the 2015 IFBB Toronto Pro Supershow, she placed 5th. At the 2015 IFBB Wings of Strength Chicago Pro, she placed 8th and won the best poser award. At the 2015 IFBB Wings of Strength PBW Tampa Pro, she won 1st place, her first IFBB pro win ever, and qualified for the 2015 IFBB Wings of Strength Rising Phoenix World Championships. At the 2015 IFBB Wings of Strength Rising Phoenix World Championships, she won the first Ms Rising Phoenix title and best poser award, becoming the de facto successor of Iris Kyle. At the 2016 IFBB Wings of Strength Rising Phoenix World Championships, she won her second title in a row, but failed to win the best poser award.

Contest history

 2007 Far East Armed Forces Bodybuilding Competition – 5th
 2012 NPC Nationals – 9th (LHW)
 2012 NPC Los Angeles Championships – 11th
 2012 NPC Pacific USA XVIII Championships – 1st
 2013 NPC USA Championships – 1st (HW and overall)
 2014 IFBB Toronto Pro Supershow – 4th
 2014 IFBB Omaha Pro – 2nd
 2014 IFBB Ms. Olympia – 10th
 2015 IFBB Omaha Pro – 7th and best poser award
 2015 IFBB Toronto Pro Supershow – 5th
 2015 IFBB Wings of Strength Chicago Pro – 8th and best poser award
 2015 IFBB Wings of Strength PBW Tampa Pro – 1st
 2015 IFBB Pro League WOS Rising Phoenix Pro Women's Bodybuilding – 1st and best poser award
 2016 IFBB Pro League WOS Rising Phoenix Pro Women's Bodybuilding – 1st
 2018 IFBB Toronto Pro Supershow – 1st
 2018 IFBB Pro League WOS Rising Phoenix Pro Women's Bodybuilding - 2nd
 2019 IFBB Toronto Pro Women's Bodybuilding - 1st
 2019 IFBB Omaha Pro Women's Bodybuilding - 1st
 2019 IFBB Pro League WOS Rising Phoenix Pro Women's Bodybuilding - 2nd
 2020 IFBB WOS Ms. Olympia - 2nd
 2021 IFBB WOS Ms. Olympia - 3rd

Personal life
Martin currently lives alone in Las Vegas, Nevada. She has 4 children; one stepdaughter, one stepson, one son, and one non-binary. She is an advocate for the LGBQTIA+ community and is openly bisexual.

External links
 Official Facebook homepage
Greatest Physiques.com

References

1979 births
African-American female bodybuilders
American expatriate sportspeople in Japan
Living people
People from Riverdale, Georgia
Sportspeople from Temecula, California
Professional bodybuilders
Sportspeople from College Park, Georgia
Female United States Marine Corps personnel
Sportspeople from the Atlanta metropolitan area
21st-century African-American sportspeople
21st-century African-American women
20th-century African-American sportspeople
20th-century African-American women
20th-century African-American people